Chlaenius elegans is a species of ground beetle in the family Carabidae.

References

Licininae
Articles created by Qbugbot
Beetles described in 1846